Meishi Street, directed by Ou Ning, is a 2006 independent Chinese documentary that portrays a group of Beijing residents protesting the planned destruction of their street prior to the 2008 Beijing Olympics. The filmmakers gave video cameras to the subjects, and they capture exclusive footage of the eviction process.

Public screening history
 2018, Xinfu Market, JUT Foundation for Arts and Architecture, Taipei
 2017, ArchiFest 2017, The Single Screen, NTU CCA Singapore
 2016, Salt Galata, Istanbul
 2016, Chinese Visual Festival, London
 2015, Australian National University
 2012, Free Word Centre
 2012, Milan Asian, African, and Latin American Film Festival
 2012, Melbourne International Film Festival
 2011, San Sebastian International Film Festival
 2010, State University of New York at Fredonia
 2010, Washington University in St. Louis
 2010, University of North Carolina at Chapel Hill
 2010, Harvard Art Museum
 2009, Museo Reina Sofia
 2009, Portland Art Museum
 2009, Duke University
 2009, Nelson-Atkins Museum of Art
 2009, Centre de Cultura Contemporània de Barcelona
 2009, exhibition, "The Symbolic Efficiency of the Frame", The 4th Tirana Biennale, Albania
 2008, exhibition, "Concrete Culture", Ivan Dougherty Gallery, College of Fine Arts, University of New South Wales
 2008, exhibition, "On Cities; maps, cars, people and narratives in the urban environment", The Swedish Museum of Architecture
 2008, 3rd Beijing Independent Film Festival
 2008, 6th Hong Kong Social Movement Film Festival
 2008, Cinémathèque québécoise, Montreal
 2008, School of Oriental and African Studies(SOAS), University of London
 2008, BAM/PFA(Berkeley), Stanford University, Columbia University, Michigan State University, University of Chicago
 2008, Nova Cinema
 2008, University of Texas at Austin, UT Documentary Center
 2008, Beijing Cultural Heritage Protection Center
 2008, Center for Architecture
 2008, BFI Southbank and Museum in Docklands, London
 2008, Babylon Cinema, Berlin
 2007, Chinema Direct program, Nova Cinema, Brussels
 2007, exhibition, "On The Outside: The Social Engine-Exploring Flexibility", ACC Galerie, Weimar
 2007, exhibition, "Not Only Possible, But Also Necessary: Optimism in the Age of Global War", the 10th Istanbul Biennial
 2007, exhibition, "Who do you think you are?", Base B, Milano Bovisa
 2007, exhibition, "World Factory", Walter and McBean Galleries, San Francisco Art Institute
2006, exhibition, "Contemporary China: Architecture, Arts and Visual Culture", 2006, NAi
 2006, exhibition, "Detours: Tactical Approaches to Urbanization in China", Eric Arthur Gallery,  University of Toronto
 2006, exhibition, "Slum: Art and Life in the Here and Now of the Civil Age", Neue Galerie Graz
 2006, exhibition, "Total Stadt: Beijing Case", ZKM, Karlsruhe
 2006, world premiere, Museum of Modern Art

References

External links
 Meishi Street for Home and Institutional Use Download
 

2006 films
Chinese documentary films
2006 documentary films
2000s Mandarin-language films
Films shot in Beijing
Films set in Beijing
Documentary films about cities
Chinese independent films